The following is a list of players, both past and current, who appeared in at least one regular season or postseason game for the Jacksonville Jaguars NFL franchise.

A

Blue Adams
Dan Alexander
Eric Alexander
Gerald Alexander
Rich Alexis
Brandon Allen
David Allen
Russell Allen
Tyson Alualu
Prince Amukamara
Curtis Anderson
Bryan Anger
Richard Angulo
Eli Ankou
Joe Anoa'i
Richard Ash
Mark Asper
Akin Ayodele

B

Jason Babin
Daniel Baldridge
Alan Ball
Tavian Banks
Bryan Barker
Reggie Barlow
Khalif Barnes
Lionel Barnes
Ainsley Battles
Kelvin Beachum
Robert Bean
Aaron Beasley
Ricky Bell
Arrelious Benn
Michael Bennett
Kevin Bentley
Steve Beuerlein
E. J. Bibbs
Jordan Black
Justin Blackmon
Will Blackmon
Willie Blade
Antwon Blake
Juran Bolden
Brock Bolen
Blake Bortles
Tony Boselli
Kyle Bosworth
Todd Bouman
Shawn Bouwens
Luke Bowanko
Alvin Bowen
Danny Boyd
James Boyd
Brant Boyer
Deral Boykin
Tyron Brackenridge
Tony Brackens
Cameron Bradfield
Kyle Brady
Andre Branch
Mike Brewster
Eben Britton
Bobby Brooks
Bucky Brooks
John Broussard
Arthur Brown
C.C. Brown
Chris Brown
Delvin Brown
Derek Brown
Milford Brown
Mike Brown
Mkristo Bruce
Mark Brunell
Fernando Bryant
Kendricke Bullard
Stephen Burton

C

Jeremy Cain
A. J. Cann
Don Carey
John Carney
Darren Carrington
Ahmad Carroll
Bernard Carter
Delone Carter
Corey Chamblin
Ike Charlton
Martin Chase
Michael Cheever
John Chick
Ryan Christopherson
Eugene Chung
Danny Clark
Reggie Clark
Vinnie Clark
Toney Clemons
Colin Cloherty
Reggie Cobb
Michael Coe
Landon Cohen
Keelan Cole
Ben Coleman
Drew Coleman
Marco Coleman
Stalin Colinet
Richard Collier
Nate Collins
Aaron Colvin
Harry Colon
Chris Combs
Mike Compton
Daniel Connolly
Sean Considine
Deke Cooper
Marquis Cooper
Jorge Cordova
Frank Cornish
Quan Cosby
Terry Cousin
Derek Cox
Kennard Cox
Renard Cox
Jason Craft
Shadwick Criss
Zack Crockett
Richie Cunningham
Eric Curry
Jacob Cutrera
Johnathan Cyprien

D

Torrance Daniels
Donovin Darius
Don Davey
Andre Davis
Jim Davis
Ryan Davis
Travis Davis
Sean Dawkins
Sheldon Day
Brandon Deaderick
Greg DeLong
Brian DeMarco
Kevin Devine
Jarett Dillard
Nate Dingle
Hugh Douglas
Leger Douzable
Chad Dukes
Mike Dumas
Vaughn Dunbar
Justin Durant

E

Jeremy Ebert
Marc Edwards
Trent Edwards
Troy Edwards
Kevin Elliott
Atiyyah Ellison
Hayden Epstein
Greg Estandia
John Estes
Josh Evans

F

Greg Favors
Jay Fiedler
Deon Figures
Jamell Fleming
Derrick Fletcher
Drayton Florence
Todd Fordham
Kynan Forney
Justin Forsett
Leonard Fournette
Dante Fowler
Brad Franklin
Stephen Franklin
Paul Frase
Chris Fuamatu-Ma'afala
Jamaal Fudge

G

Isaiah Gardner
David Garrard
Rashid Gayle
Damon Gibson
Tony Gilbert
Jason Gildon
Tashaun Gipson
Ernest Givins
Aaron Glenn
Keith Goganious
Roger Graham
Corey Grant
Deon Grant
Dwayne Gratz
Quinn Gray
Brandon Green
Donny Green
Rogerick Green
Courtney Greene
Rashad Greene
Nick Greisen
Rich Griffith
Jonathan Grimes
Quentin Groves
Monty Grow
Winston Guy

H

Dana Hall
Ray Hall
Ty Hallock
James Hamilton
Michael Hamlin
Cortez Hankton
Chris Hanson
Clay Harbor
Kevin Hardy
Chris Harrington
DuJuan Harris
Chris Harris
Mike Harris
Nick Harris
Larry Hart
Derrick Harvey
Kevin Haslam
Matthew Hatchette
Brent Hawkins
Geno Hayes
Reggie Hayward
T. J. Heath
John Henderson
Tommy Hendricks
Chad Henne
Jason Hill
Mike Hollis
Jaret Holmes
Torry Holt
Davon House
Chris Howard
Desmond Howard
Chris Hudson
Deon Humphrey
Nate Hughes
Wayne Hunter
Greg Huntington
Allen Hurns

I

Clint Ingram
Steve Ingram
Corvey Irvin
Rod Issac
Chris Ivory
Brian Iwuh

J

Myles Jack
Chevis Jackson
Grady Jackson
Jerrell Jackson
Malik Jackson
Lenzie Jackson
Willie Jackson
Rashad Jennings
Luke Joeckel
Anthony Johnson
Josh Johnson
Kevin Johnson
Patrick Johnson
Rob Johnson
Tommy Johnson
Abry Jones
Brian Jones
Damon Jones
David Jones
Greg Jones (2004-2012)
Greg Jones (2012)
Matt Jones
George Jones
Maurice Jones-Drew
Leander Jordan
Randy Jordan
Elvis Joseph
John Jurkovic

K

Aaron Kampman
Deji Karim
Craig Keith
Jimmy Kennedy
Jammie Kirlew
Sammy Knight
Terrance Knighton
Kyle Knox
Aaron Koch
Jeff Kopp
Ben Koyack

L

Jeff Lageman
Carnell Lake
Kevin Landolt
Derek Landri
Dawan Landry
Austen Lane
Gordon Laro
Trevor Lawrence 
Marqise Lee
Byron Leftwich
Cleo Lemon
Matt Leonard
Emarlos Leroy
Jermaine Lewis
Marcedes Lewis
Brandon Linder
Steve Lindsey
Kevin Lockett
Michael Lockley
Ernie Logan
Mike Logan
John Lotulelei
Kyle Love
Omare Lowe
Reggie Lowe
Dwight Lowery
Calvin Lowry
Chris Luzar

M

Stacey Mack
Malaefou MacKenzie
Anthony Maddox
Vince Manuwai
Sen'Derrick Marks
Seth Marler
Curtis Marsh
Brandon Marshall
Jamie Martin
Lonnie Marts
Eddie Mason
Robert Massey
Le'Shai Maston
Rashean Mathis
John Matthews
Steve Matthews
Corey Mayfield
Darcel McBath
Trumaine McBride
Keenan McCardell
Jacques McClendon
Bobby McCray
Demetrius McCray
Luke McCown
Marlon McCree
Tony McDaniel
Stockar McDougle
Blaine McElmurry
Tom McManus
Natrone Means
Brad Meester
Rob Meier
William Middleton
Bronzell Miller
Craig Miller
Jordan Miller
Roy Miller
Zach Miller
Javor Mills
Jeremy Mincey
Anthony Mitchell
Keith Mitchell
Pete Mitchell
Antwaun Molden
Eugene Monroe
Will Moore
Frank Moreau
Aaron Morgan
Kirk Morrison
C.J. Mosley
Richard Murphy
Tom Myslinski

N

Chris Naeole
Jeremy Navarre
Reggie Nelson
Jamar Nesbit
Drake Nevis
Ryan Neufeld
Quentin Neujahr
Jamar Newsome
Yannick Ngakoue
Hardy Nickerson
Chad Nkang
Danny Noble
Dennis Norman
Slade Norris
Dennis Northcutt
Drew Nowak
Jeff Novak
Uche Nwaneri

O

Erik Olson
Fendi Onobun
Shantee Orr
Kassim Osgood
Chad Owens
Montell Owens
Akwasi Owusu-Ansah

P

Tobais Palmer
Chris Parker
Ricky Parker
Jalen Parmele
Jermey Parnell
Tony Pashos
Austin Pasztor
Elton Patterson
Bryce Paup
Seth Payne
Alvin Pearman
Mike Pearson
Troy Pelshak
Jeris Pendleton
Ray Perryman
Greg Peterson
Mike Peterson
Will Peterson
Kenneth Pettway
Adam Podlesh
Jerry Porter
Sean Porter
Jeff Posey
Paul Posluszny
Zach Potter
Taylor Price
Ryan Prince
Pierson Prioleau
Kelvin Pritchett
Chris Prosinski
Hayes Pullard

Q

Jonathan Quinn

Shaquille Quarterman

R

Will Rackley
Wali Rainer
Jalen Ramsey
Derrick Ransom
Jimmy Redmond
Chris Reed
Allen Reisner
Tutan Reyes
LaRoy Reynolds
David Richardson
David Richie
Andre Rison
Gerald Rivers
Allen Robinson
Chris Roberson
James Roberson
Denard Robinson
Eddie Robinson
Laurent Robinson
Aaron Ross
Micah Ross
Matt Roth
Martin Rucker
Brian Russell
Kevin Rutland

S

Troy Sadowski
Ephraim Salaam
Ace Sanders
Bryan Schwartz
Josh Scobee
Leon Searcy
Tim Seder
George Selvie
Gerald Sensabaugh
Clint Session
Tawambi Settles
Adam Seward
Tyler Shatley
Daimon Shelton
Gannon Shepherd
Ashley Sheppard
Jordan Shipley
Cecil Shorts
Clyde Simmons
Bobby Shaw
Tim Shaw
Mike Sims-Walker
Dan Skuta
T.J. Slaughter
Joel Smeenge
Justin Smiley
Anthony Smith
Bryan Smith
Chris Smith
D'Anthony Smith
Daryl Smith
Emanuel Smith
Fernando Smith
Jeff Smith
Jimmy Smith
Larry Smith
Steve Smith
Telvin Smith
Isaac Smolko
Nick Sorensen
R. Jay Soward
Stephen Spach
Paul Spicer
Jason Spitz
Micheal Spurlock
Brendan Stai
Isaiah Stanback
Julian Stanford
Montavious Stanley
Scott Starks
Santo Stephens
Neal Sterling
James Stewart
Rayna Stewart
Shyrone Stith
J.J. Stokes
Erik Storz
Maurice Stovall
Marcus Stroud
Darren Studstill
Nathan Stupar
Michael Swift

T

Jim Tarle
Will Ta'ufo'ou
Cordell Taylor
Fred Taylor
Herbert Taylor
Kerry Taylor
Shannon Taylor
Daryl Terrell
Corey Terry
Dave Thomas
Edward Thomas
J.T. Thomas
Julius Thomas
Kiwaukee Thomas
Lamaar Thomas
Mike Thomas
Tra Thomas
Lamont Thompson
Mike Thompson
Pat Thomas
Jabbar Threats
Cedric Tillman
Carson Tinker
Jordan Todman
LaBrandon Toefield
Keith Toston
James Trapp
Morgan Trent
Esera Tuaolo
Joe Tuipala
Matt Turk
Rich Tylski

U

Tiquan Underwood
Regan Upshaw

V

Steve Vallos

W

John Wade
Gary Walker
Chauncey Washington
Dewayne Washington
Mickey Washington
Patrick Washington
Steve Weatherford
Dee Webb
Josh Wells
Joe Wesley
Chastin West
Eric Westmoreland
Terrence Wheatley
Damen Wheeler
Guy Whimper
Jose White
Reggie White
Tracy White
Bob Whitfield
Alvis Whitted
Dave Widell
Zach Wiegert
Marcellus Wiley
Ernest Wilford
Bruce Wilkerson
Brian Williams
D.J. Williams
James Williams
Jermaine Williams
Julius Williams
Lamanzer Williams
Mark Williams
Maurice Williams
Reggie Williams
Stephen Williams
Thomas Williams
Troy Williamson
Derrick Wimbush
Jamie Winborn
Brian Witherspoon
D'Juan Woods
George Wrighster
Kenny Wright
James Wyche
Renaldo Wynn

Y

T. J. Yeldon
Todd Yoder
Ashton Youboty
Sam Young

Z

Steve Zahursky
Joe Zelenka

See also
List of Jacksonville Jaguars starting quarterbacks
List of Jacksonville Jaguars first-round draft picks
List of Jacksonville Jaguars head coaches
List of Jacksonville Jaguars broadcasters

References

External links
Jacksonville Jaguars all-time roster

Jacksonville Jaguars

players